The Călmățui is a left tributary of the river Danube in Romania. It discharges into the Danube near Suhaia. It flows through the villages Stoicănești, Radomirești, Călinești, Crângeni, Călmățuiu, Salcia, Putineiu, Dracea, Crângu, Lisa and Viișoara.

References

Rivers of Teleorman County
Rivers of Olt County
Rivers of Romania